Habib Bank Limited Football Club, commonly known as Habib Bank Football Club and HBL F.C., was a Pakistani football club based in Karachi, Sindh. It played in the Football Federation League. The club was formed in 1975 by Habib Bank, hence giving it the nickname, The Bankers. 

HBL won the National Championship in 1985, beating Pakistan Railways into second place. They have also been runners up three times. It also represented Pakistan at the Asian Club Championship (now the AFC Champions League) in 1986. 

They were one of the founding members of the Pakistan Premier League. They were relegated in the 2006–07 season, but were elected to return following expansion of the league alongside Pakistan Airlines.

Honours
Pakistan Premier League: (1)
1982
Pakistan National Football Challenge Cup: (1)
1985

Performance in AFC competitions
Asian Club Championship: 1 appearance
1987 – Qualifying Stage

References

Football clubs in Pakistan
1975 establishments in Pakistan
Financial services association football clubs in Pakistan
Football in Karachi